Emma Goetz (born 6 January 2006) is a Luxembourger footballer who plays as a goalkeeper for Frauen-Bundesliga club Freiburg and the Luxembourg women's national team.

International career
Goetz made her senior debut for Luxembourg on 16 February 2022 during a 5–0 friendly win against Tahiti.

References

2006 births
Living people
Women's association football goalkeepers
Luxembourgian women's footballers
Luxembourg women's international footballers